The 1910–11 Yorkshire Cup was a knock-out competition between (mainly professional) rugby league clubs from the county of Yorkshire. The actual area was at times increased to encompass other teams from  outside the  county such as Newcastle, Mansfield, Coventry (as this season), and even London (in the form of Acton & Willesden. The competition always took place early in the season, in the Autumn, with the final taking place in (or just before) December (The only exception to this was when disruption of the fixture list was caused during, and immediately after, the two World Wars.) 1910 was the sixth occasion on which the  Yorkshire Cup competition was held. This year saw a new name on the trophy. Wakefield Trinity won by beating the previous season's winners, Huddersfield by the score of 8-2.
The match was played at Headingley, Leeds, now in West Yorkshire. The attendance was 19,000 and receipts were £696. This was Huddersfield's second appearance in what would be seven appearances in eight consecutive finals between 1909 and 1919 (which included four successive victories and six in total.)

Background 

This season Coventry's name was added to the entrants as newcomers to rugby league. This increased the number of entries by one up to a total of fourteen. This in turn resulted in two byes in the first round.

Competition and Results

Round 1 
Involved  6 matches (with two byes) and 14 clubs

Round 2 – quarterfinals 
Involved 4 matches and 8 clubs

Round 3 – semifinals  
Involved 2 matches and 4 clubs

Final

Teams and scorers 

Scoring - Try = three (3) points - Goal = two (2) points - Drop goal = two (2) points

The road to success

Notes and comments 
1 * The first (and only) game played by new club Coventry  in the Yorkshire Cup. The next season they transferred to the Lancashire Cup competition

2 * Headingley, Leeds, is the home ground of Leeds RLFC with a capacity of 21,000. The record attendance was  40,175 for a league match between Leeds and Bradford Northern on 21 May 1947.

See also 
1910–11 Northern Rugby Football Union season
Rugby league county cups

References

External links
Saints Heritage Society
1896–97 Northern Rugby Football Union season at wigan.rlfans.com
Hull&Proud Fixtures & Results 1896/1897
Widnes Vikings - One team, one passion Season In Review - 1896-97
The Northern Union at warringtonwolves.org

RFL Yorkshire Cup
Yorkshire Cup